Jakob Kehlet (born 5 September 1980) is a Danish professional football referee. He has been a full international for FIFA since 2011.

References 

1983 births
Living people
Danish football referees